Robert Hébras (29 June 1925 – 11 February 2023) was one of only six people to survive the massacre of Oradour by Nazi Germany's Waffen-SS Das Reich Panzer Division on 10 June 1944. He was born in Oradour-sur-Glane, the son of Jean, a tramway maintenance official and Marie, a seamstress. Adolf Diekmann, the Waffen-SS officer who commanded the battalion that perpetrated the massacre, was killed in action in Normandy in 29 June 1944, coincidentally Hébras's 19th birthday. Hébras died on 11 February 2023, at the age of 97. He was the last living survivor from the Oradour-sur-Glane massacre. In 2014, he published a memoir, Avant que ma voix s’éteigne.

Awards and decorations 
 Legion of Honour (13 July 2010)
 Chevalier of the Legion of Honour (9 June 2001)
 Commander of the Ordre national du Mérit (25 January 2022)
 Commander of the Ordre des Palmes académiques (30 November 2019)
 Order of Merit of the Federal Republic of Germany (2 June 2015)

Citations

References

External links 
Interview with Robert Hébras

1925 births
2023 deaths
Oradour-sur-Glane massacre
Execution survivors
Officiers of the Légion d'honneur
Commanders of the Ordre national du Mérite
Commandeurs of the Ordre des Palmes Académiques
Officers Crosses of the Order of Merit of the Federal Republic of Germany
People from Haute-Vienne